The Alan R. Barton Nuclear Plant was a proposed commercial nuclear power plant in central Alabama, United States.

Proposed plant
Alabama Power Company proposed constructing four 1,159 MWe General Electric Boiling Water Reactors at the site approximately 15 miles southeast of Clanton, Alabama. 

The proposed plant was named after Alabama Power Company Senior Vice President Alan R. Barton.

The proposed plant was identified by the acronym ABNP in Nuclear Regulatory Commission correspondence.

1970s cancellation
Barton 3 & 4 were canceled in 1975 while under 10CFR50 Construction Permit (CP) review. Two years later, Barton 1 & 2 were canceled during the CP review process as well.

Reactor data 
The nuclear power plant was to have had four units:

References

Nuclear power plants in Alabama
Cancelled nuclear power stations in the United States